The naming of weapons in Middle-earth is the giving of names to swords and other powerful weapons in J. R. R. Tolkien's legendarium. He derived the naming of weapons from his knowledge of Medieval times; the practice is found in Norse mythology and in the Old English poem Beowulf. 
Among the many weapons named by Tolkien are Orcrist and Glamdring in The Hobbit, and Narsil / Andúril in The Lord of the Rings. Such weapons carry powerful symbolism, embodying the identity and ancestry of their owners.

There are multiple parallels between Tolkien's usage of named weapons in his Middle-earth writings, and the Medieval epics. These include their inheritance as heirlooms, sometimes royal; their rediscovery in ancient treasure-hoards; their being broken and reforged; their adornment with runic inscriptions; and their interlinking with the lives of their owners.

Background

Naming of Medieval weapons 

In Medieval epics, heroes gave names to their weapons. The name, lineage, and power of the weapon reflected on the hero. Among the major tales are those of Sigurd the Volsung and his sword Gram that he used to kill the dragon Fafnir; Beowulf and the swords Hrunting and Nægling; King Arthur's Excalibur, the "Sword in the Stone"; Roland's Durendal; Waldere's Mimming; and the Elder Eddas account of the "Waking of Angantyr" (the Hervararkviða) and the sword Tyrfing.

Heroic literature did not always name its weapons; in ancient Greece, Homer describes the shield and spear of Achilles in detail but does not give them names. He does not name the crucial bow of Odysseus: the weapon that allows him to demonstrate his own identity, his own name as he returns home to Ithaca, functions anonymously in the story. The case is different in the stories and myths of medieval Northern Europe, where the name of a weapon, especially of a sword, gave it an identity, almost a personality. The name, writes the Tolkien scholar Janet Brennan Croft, "marks a weapon as an heirloom tying generations together and legitimizing the heir who holds it." Some 200 sword names are recorded in medieval writings, in line with the Norse practice of naming objects in stories, such as the Dwarf-made chain Gleipnir that unbreakably fastened Fenris the giant wolf.

Powerful swords 

Such weapons were praised both for their strength and for their history. For example, Nægling is repeatedly described with epithets such as "sharp", "gleaming", "bright", "mighty", and "strong", while its history is explicitly recalled in phrases such as "excellent ancient sword", "ancient heirloom", and "old and grey". They might have magical powers: Excalibur shines 

In Norse mythology, similarly, a sword may shine like the sun, as in the Poetic Edda: "Surt from the south comes / With flickering flame; Shines from his sword / The Val-god’s sun."

Swords may be heirlooms within a royal family, or may be recovered from ancient hoards of treasure, in either case having a lineage and story of their own. A sword-blade could be adorned with runes; these might attach power, history, and magic spells to the weapon, just as Sigurd was instructed to engrave runes of wisdom and victory on his sword Gram. The historian of arms Ewart Oakeshott described the sword as having "a potent mystique which sets it above any other man-made object". Swords had two attributes which made them especially highly prized: they were costly to manufacture, and effective as weapons.

In Middle-earth

Weapons of power 

Tolkien named many weapons, mainly swords, but also including Aeglos, the spear of the Elf-king Gil-Galad; Belthronding, Beleg's bow; Dramborleg, Tuor's axe; and Grond, the name both of the evil battering-ram from Minas Morgul, and of the mace of the first Dark Lord, Morgoth, in his Middle-earth writings. As in medieval epics, the sword in particular symbolised the heroism and position of its owner. As the Tolkien scholar Verlyn Flieger put it, the sword "proclaims the emergence of the hero"; further, "the fates of sword and man are linked, and the destruction of one signals the end of the other".

Such themes can be seen clearly with Aragorn's sword Andúril, but they run similarly through Tolkien's accounts of many other named weapons. The swords Glamdring and Orcrist named in The Hobbit fit two strands of the Medieval pattern, as they are both ancient, having been forged in the First Age, and were retrieved from a treasure-hoard, having been held by the three Trolls in their cave. Reforging and rediscovery effectively pass old power to the new weapon and its new owner, and renew that power.  

These two swords actually each have three names (polyonymy): in the high and ancient tongue; a translation into the Common Speech, rendered as English; and a goblin nickname.

Glamdring and Orcrist, and Bilbo's knife used as a sword, which he named Sting, gleam when Orcs are nearby; the ancient swords terrify the Orcs, and are recognised by them; indeed, the Orcs have their own nicknames for the two famous swords, Biter and Beater. These weapons have numerous connections to the famous swords of Medieval mythology, including, according to the Tolkien scholars K. S. Whetter and R. Andrew McDonald, the style and content of their names, which recall the names of swords in Norse mythology such as Fotbitr and Dragvandil ("Leg-biter" and "Slicer"). Indeed, in The Hobbit, when Bilbo's party arrive at Rivendell, Elrond reads the swords' runic inscriptions and describes the heroic history and lineage of the recovered weapons:

"Renewed shall be blade that was broken" 

The Lord of the Rings hero Aragorn, heir of the kingdoms of Gondor and Arnor, carried the shards of the sword Narsil, broken when his ancestor Elendil died in battle with the Dark Lord Sauron. Its name, Narsil, contained the roots for "fire" and "white light", meaning "Sun and Moon" in Quenya. It had been forged in the First Age by the greatest of the Dwarf-smiths, Telchar. He worked into the enchanted sword the ability to shine "with the light of the sun and of the moon", with the result that "the sword of Elendil filled Orcs and Men with fear". After it was broken "its light was extinguished and it was not forged anew", until Aragorn brought it to Rivendell at the end of the Third Age and the quest to destroy the One Ring. It was then remade as Andúril, meaning "Flame of the West" in Quenya: 

The seven stars were Elendil's heraldic device, which in turn denoted the stars, one per ship, for the seven ships that carried the seven palantirs from Númenor, the island of the West, to Middle-earth. The sword thus carried the symbolism of the lineage of Elendil and the power of the kingdom of Númenor. In addition, Tolkien wrote that the sword's original name, Narsil, "symbolised the chief heavenly lights [Sun and Moon], as enemies of darkness". 

The poem that Aragorn says goes with his own name, "The Riddle of Strider", calls the sword the "blade that was broken": 

There are multiple parallels here with Arthurian legend. The Sword in the Stone is broken. Just as Excalibur delimits King Arthur's reign, so Narsil delimits the Third Age, beginning when Isildur cuts the Ring from Sauron's hand, and ending when the remade Andúril helps to end Sauron's power and restore Aragorn as King. Both Kings lead their peoples to victory. The sword's magical scabbard, too, which the Elf-queen Galadriel gives to Aragorn as he leaves Lothlórien with the words "The blade that is drawn from this sheath shall not be stained or broken even in defeat", parallels Excalibur's sheath, which guarantees that its wearer "shall never lose no blood, be ye never so sore wounded". The elven scabbard describes the sword it was made for:

The theme of the sword that was broken is found in various places in Norse mythology. Burdge and Burke write that Tyrfing, like Narsil, was Dwarf-forged, in its case by Dvalin and Durin. They made Tyrfing shine like fire; Andúril shines like Sun and Moon. Sigurd's sword Gram, too, was remade, by the Dwarf-smith Regin; Sigurd's father Sigmund's dying wish was for his sword to be reforged; and flames leapt from Gram's edges. Aragorn's sword thus combines the natures of the Norse sword Gram and the Arthurian Excalibur.

The reforged and renamed Narsil / Andúril pair has a parallel, too, within Tolkien's legendarium. The hero of the First Age, Túrin's sword, is similarly renamed: Anglachel becomes Gurthang. The Tolkien scholars K. S. Whetter and Andrew McDonald call these weapons almost "living personalities"; Croft notes that at the end, Gurthang actually speaks to Túrin. However, while the reforging of Andúril symbolizes the remaking of Middle-earth and the transformation of Aragorn from Ranger to King, the mere renaming of Gurthang fails to change its "essentially malefic" nature. Like the flawed hero Túrin, who likewise takes on different names, its character cannot be changed by giving it a new name. In contrast, Aragorn's sword represents the true hero.

Notes

References

Primary 

This list identifies each item's location in Tolkien's writings.

Secondary

Sources 

 
 
 
 
 
 
 
 
 
 
 
 
 
 
 
 
 
 
 

Middle-earth weapons
Themes of The Lord of the Rings